"Jimmy Crack Corn" or "Blue-Tail Fly" is an American song which first became popular during the rise of blackface minstrelsy in the 1840s through performances by the Virginia Minstrels.   It regained currency as a folk song in the 1940s at the beginning of the American folk music revival and has since become a popular children's song. Over the years, several variants have appeared.

Most versions include some idiomatic African American English, although General American versions now predominate. The basic narrative remains intact. On the surface, the song is a black slave's lament over his white master's death in a horse-riding  accident. The song, however, is also interpreted as having a subtext of celebration about that death and of the slave's having contributed to it through deliberate negligence or even deniable action.

Lyrics

Melody 
The melody is similar to "Miss Lucy Long" and was originally set for piano accompaniment, although "De Blue Tail Fly" was marketed in Boston as one of "Emmett's Banjo Melodies". The four-part chorus favors a single bass and three tenors: the first and third tenors harmonize in thirds with the second completes the triads or doubles the root, sometimes crossing the melody line. The versions published in 1846 differed rather markedly: "De Blue Tail Fly" is modal (although Lhamar emends its B♭ notation to C minor) and hexatonic; "Jim Crack Corn", meanwhile, is in G major and more easily singable. Its simplicity has made it a common beginner's tune for acoustic guitar. The melody is a chain of thirds (G-B, F♯-A, G-B, [A]-C, B-D, C-E) harmonized a third above and below in the manner of the choruses in Italian opera.

Meaning 
The first verses usually establish that the singer was initially a house slave. He is then charged with protecting the master out of doors—and his horse as well—from the "blue-tailed fly". This is possibly the blue bottle fly (Calliphora vomitoria or Protophormia terraenovae), but probably the mourning horsefly (Tabanus atratus), a bloodsucking pest with a blue-black abdomen found throughout the American South. In this, the singer, ultimately, is unsuccessful; the horse begins to buck, and the master is thrown and killed. A coroner's jury is convened to investigate the master's death, or the singer is criminally charged with that death, but owing to the "blue-tail fly," the slave escapes culpability.

The chorus can be mystifying to modern listeners, but its straightforward meaning is that someone is roughly milling ("cracking") the old master's corn in preparation for turning it into hominy or liquor. There has been much debate, however, over the subtext. In the 19th century, the singer was often considered mournful and despondent at his master's death; in the 20th, celebratory: "Jimmy Crack Corn" has been called "the baldest, most loving account of the master's demise" in American song.

The debate has been further muddled by changes to the refrain over time. Throughout the 19th century, the lines referred to "Jim", "Jim Crack", or "Jim Crack Corn" and lacked any conjunction across the line's caesura; following the rise of highly-syncopated musical genres such as ragtime and jazz, anaptyxis converted the name to "Jimmy" or "Jimmie" and the "and" appeared, both putting more stress on their measures' backbeat. This has obscured some of the possible original meanings: some have argued that—as "Jim" was a generic name for slaves in minstrel songs—the song's "Jim" was the same person as its blackface narrator: Speaking about himself in the 3rd person or repeating his new masters' commands in apostrophe, he has no concern with his demotion to a field hand now that his old master is dead.

Since "corn" was also a common rural American ellipsis and euphemism for "corn whiskey", it could also refer to the slave being so overcome that he has no concern about his rotgut alcohol. The 1811 Dictionary of Vulgar Tongue by Francis Grose defines a jimcrack as a "spruce woman", so perhaps the lyric refers to the slave being so sad he doesn't have interest in an approaching beautiful woman.

Other suppositions include that "cracking" or "cracking corn" referred to the now-obsolete English and Appalachian slang meaning "to gossip" or "to sit around chitchatting"; that the singer is resting from his oversight duties and allowing Jim to steal corn or corn liquor; that "Jim Crack" is simply a synonym for "Jim Crow" by means of the dialectical "crack" to reference the crake; or that it is all code for the old master "Jim" cracking his "corn" (skull) open during his fall. The 1847 version of the song published in London singularly has the lyrics "Jim Crack com'", which could refer to a poor Southern cracker (presumably an overseer or new owner) or a minced oath for Jesus Christ (thus referencing indifference at the Judgment Day); the same version explicitly makes the fly's name a wordplay on the earlier minstrel hit "Long Tail Blue", about a horse. A number of racehorses have been named "Jim Crack" or "Blue Tail Fly" and, in at least one early-20th century variant of the song, it's given as the name of the horse that killed the master, but that is not a common element of the song. (Another uncommon variant appeared in the 1847 Songs of Ireland published in New York: it has the slave being given away by the master.)

Explanations of the song based upon "jimmy" or "jimmie" being slaves' slang for crows or mules (here being allowed into the old master's corn fields instead of being chased away) or deriving "jimmy" from "gimme" are unsupported by the existing records. Pete Seeger, for instance, is said to have maintained that the original lyrics were "gimme cracked corn" and referred to a punishment in which a slave's bacon rations were curtailed, leaving him chickenfeed; the same lines could also just be asking for the whiskey jug to be passed around. The idea that Jim or Jimmy is "cracking open" a jug of whiskey is similarly unsupported: that phrasal verb is attested at least as early as 1803 but initially applied to literal ruptures; its application to opening the cap or cork of a bottle of alcohol was a later development.

History 
The present song is generally credited to Dan Emmett's Virginia Minstrels, whose shows in New York City in the mid-1840s helped raise minstrelsy to national attention. Along with "Old Dan Tucker", the tune was one of the breakout hits of the genre and continued to headline Emmett's acts with Bryant's Minstrels into the 1860s. It was also a common song of Tom Rice. The song was first published (with two distinct sets of lyrics) in Baltimore and Boston in 1846, although it is sometimes mistakenly dated to 1844. However, as with later rockabilly hits, it is quite possible Emmett simply received credit for arranging and publishing an existing African-American song. The song was certainly picked up by slaves and became widely popular among them. The chorus of the song not uncommonly appeared in the middle of other African-American folk songs, one of which may have been its original source. The song differed from other minstrel tunes in long remaining popular among African Americans: it was recorded by both Big Bill Broonzy and Lead Belly after World War II.

Abraham Lincoln was an admirer of the tune, calling it "that buzzing song". Throughout the 19th century, it was usually accompanied by the harmonica or by humming which mimicked the buzzing of the fly (which on at least one occasion was noted disrupting the parliament of Victoria, Australia.). Lincoln would ask his friend Ward Lamon to sing and play it on his banjo and likely played along on his harmonica. It is said that he asked for it to be played as the lead-in to his address at Gettysburg.

Following World War II, the "Blue Tail Fly" was repopularized by the Andrews Sisters' 1947 recording with the folk singer Burl Ives. It then became part of the general Folk Revival through the '50s and early '60s before losing favor to more politically charged fare, as parodied by Tom Lehrer's "Folk Song Army". A 1963 Time article averred that "instead of ... chronicling the life cycle of the blue-tailed fly", the "most sought-after folk singers in the business"—including Pete Seeger, Theodore Bikel, and Bob Dylan—were "singing with hot-eyed fervor about police dogs and racial murder". All the same, Seeger claimed to have been present when Alan Lomax first taught the song to Burl Ives for a CBS radio show and their duet at the 92nd Street Y in New York City in 1993 was Ives' last public performance.

The song has also occurred as instrumentals:
 An instrumental rock & roll rendition, "Beatnik Fly", was recorded by Johnny and the Hurricanes in 1959, and released on Warwick Records, catalog number M-520.  It charted on the Billboard Hot 100 at number 15 in the US, and number 8 in the UK.
 A surf version (inspired by "Beatnik Fly"), "Foam And Fiberglass", was recorded by Mike Adams and the Red Jackets on the album Surfers Beat by Crown Records in 1963.

Seeger maintained that the song's subtext gave it a social justice element but began (with 1953's American Folksongs for Children) to perform and market the work as a children's sing-along. Usually under the name "Jimmy Crack Corn", it remains common at campfires and summer camps. It is also sampled in a number of rap songs—including Tuff Crew and Eminem's compositions (both titled "Jimmy Crack Corn")—playing on the present usage of "crack".

In popular culture 

{{hidden
|Cover versions and musical cameos
|
 1930s: "Blue Tail Fly" on Pinto Pete in Arizona
 1944: "The Blue Tail Fly" by Burl Ives (The Wayfaring Stranger)
 1946: "The Blue Tail Fly", a single by Riley Shephard
 1947: "The Blue Tail Fly", a single by Burl Ives & the Andrews Sisters
 1947: "The Blue Tail Fly" by Bradley Kincaid
 1948 (rec.): "Blue Tail Fly" by Lead Belly (Leadbelly's Last Sessions)
 1948: "Blue Tail Fly", a single by Bob Atcher
 1948: "Blue Tail Fly", a single by Homer and Jethro
 1949: "Blue Tail Fly", a single by Bradley Kincaid
 1950s: "The Blue Tailed Fly" by Doc Hopkins
 1951 (rec.): "Blue Tail Fly" by Big Bill Broonzy (Folk Blues)
 c. 1953: "Blue Tail Fly" by Jack Arthur (Peter Pan #2255)
 1953: "Blue Tail Fly" by Pete Seeger (American Folksongs for Children)
 1953: "Blue Tail Fly", a single by Kenneth Lynn & the Cricketone Chorus
 1955: "Blue Tail Fly" by the Roger Wagner Chorale (Folk Songs of the New World)
 1957: "The Blue Tail Fly" by Milt Okun (America's Best Loved Folk Songs)
 1958: "Blue Tail Fly" by Paul Sykes (Great American Folk Songs)
 1958: "The Blue Tail Fly" by the Cadet Glee Club of West Point (The Army Way)
 1958: "Blue Tail Fly" by Grandma Moses (Christmas with Grandma Moses)
 c. 1959: "Blue Tail Fly" by Kate Smith (The Great Kate)
 1959: "Blue Tail Fly" by Shirley Abicair (Four Favourites)
 1959: "Blue Tail Fly" by Edie Adams (Edie Adams Sings? Music to Listen to Records By)
 1959: "The Blue Tail Fly" by Mitch Miller and the Gang (Folk Songs: Sing Along with Mitch)
 1959: "Pete's Tail-Fly" by Lawrence Welk and His Dixieland Boys (Lawrence Welk Plays Dixieland)
 1959: "Blue Tail Fly" by Stuff Smith (Sweet Swingin' Stuff)
 1959: "The Blue-Tail Fly" by Yodelin' Slim Clark (Cowboy Songs)
 1959: "The Blue Tail Fly" by the Forty-Niners Quartet (Jim Fassett's Hear the Animals Sing & Other Animal Songs)
 1959: "Beatnik Fly", an instrumental single by Johnny and the Hurricanes
 1960: "Blue Tail Fly" by Rex Trailer and the Playboys (Country and Western)
 1960: "Blue Tail Fly" by Sy Oliver and His Orchestra (Oliver's Twist)
 1960: "The Blue Tail Fly", a single by Denis Gibbons
 1960: "The Blue Tail Fly" by Jimmie Blaine (Cowboy Songs for Children)
 c. 1960: "Blue Tail Fly" by the Range Hands (Western Hootenanny!)
 c. 1960: "Blue Tail Fly" by the Idlers (Hootenanny with the Idlers of the Coast Guard Academy Cadets)
 1960s: "Blue Tail Fly" by Rudy Vallée (The Good Old Songs with Selections by the Old Timers)
 1961: "Blue Tail Fly" by Win Stracke (Songs of Early Times)
 1961: "The Blue Tail Fly" by Henry Jerome and His Orchestra (Brazen Brass New Sounds in Folk Music)
 1962: "I Don't Care" by The Smothers Brothers (The Two Sides of the Smothers Brothers)
 1962: "The Blue Tail Fly" by the Johnny Mann Singers (Golden Folk Song Hits)
 1962: "Jimmy Crack Corn" by Graham McCarthy (Best Loved Folk Songs)
 1962: "Blue Tail Fly" by the Ventures (Twist Party)
 1962: "The Blue Tail Fly" by Tex Morris and the Ranchers (Way Out West)
 1962: "Blue Tail Fly" by the Living Voices (Sing Along with the Living Voices)
 1963: "Blue Tail Fly" by the Harold Land Quintet (Jazz Impressions of Folk Music)
 1963: "The Blue Tail Fly" by Men of Song (Folk Hits by Men of Song)
 1963: "The Blue Tail Fly" by the Folk Singer (eponymous)
 1964: "Jimmy Crack Corn" by Pete Seeger (Freight Train)
 1964: "Blue Tail Fly" by 'Les Carle' (Where Have All the Flowers Gone)
 1964: "Carolina Blue Tail Fly" by the Village Stompers (Around the World with the Village Stompers)
 1964: "The Blue Tail Fly" by the Gregg Smith Singers (American Folk Songs)
 1964: "The Blue-Tail Fly" by Mantovani and His Orchestra (Folk Songs around the World)
 1964: "The Blue Tail Fly" by Reg Lindsay (Country and Western Singalong)
 1964: "Blue Tail Fly" by Rusty Adams and Buzz Wilson (Country Hits Made Famous By Johnny Cash and Marty Robbins)
 1965: "Blue Tail Fly" by the Sound Stage Chorus (Favorite Songs from Walt Disney's Mary Poppins)
 1965: "Blue Tail Fly" by the Charleston Trio (Let's Go Folksy!)
 1965: "The Blue-Tail Fly" (The Wonderful World of Music for Children)
 1965: "Blue Tail Fly" by the Beechmonts (The Beechmonts in a Concert of Folk Songs)
 1965: "La mouche bleue" by Graeme Allwright
 1966: "Blue Tail Fly", a single by the Hillbilly Bears
 1967: "Blue Tail Fly" by the Renfro Valley Pioneers (Merle Travis, also starring The Renfro Valley Pioneers)
 1967: "Blue Tail Fly" by Hylo Brown and His Timberliners (Rural Rhythm Presents Hylo Brown)
 1968: "Blue Tail Fly" by Frank Saunders (Country & Western Music Jamboree)
 1969: "Blue Tail Fly" by the Richard Wolfe Children's Chorus (Yellow Submarine and Other Big Hits for Little People)
 1970: "Blue Tail Fly" by the Moody Five (Blues-Rock Festival '70)
 1970: "Blu-Tail Fly" by Nils Tibor (Non-Stop Hammond Dancing)
 1971: "Blue Tail Fly" by the Band of the Royal International Guards (Ceremonial Music of the Band)
 1972: "Blue Tail Fly" by the Merry Singers (The Candy Man and Other Delicious Sweets)
 1972: "Blue Tail Fly" (The Great Welsh Male Voice Tradition)
 1973: "De Debil Take de Blue-Tail Fly" by Chris Thompson (eponymous)
 1973: "Blue Tail Fly" by Orchester Kay Webb (Trompeten-Träume in Gold)
 1973: "The Blue Tail Fly" by Mr. Pickwick's Minstrel Show (eponymous)
 1973: "Blue Tail Fly" by the Longines Symphonette (Folk Songs of the World)
 1975: "Ballad of the Blue-Tail Fly" by Bryan Chalker (Songs & Ballads)
 1976: "Blue Tail Fly" by Mass Production (Mass Production Celebrates American Music)
 1976: "Blue Tail Fly" by Kate Smith (Happy Birthday to America!)
 1976: "Blue-Tail Fly" by Michael Cooney (Steamboat's a-Comin)
 1977: "Jim Crack Corn" by Mike Seeger (American Folk Songs for Children)
 1977: "The Blue Tailed Fly" by Johnny Richardson (Sing Along, Clap Along with Johnny Richardson)
 1977: "The Blue-Tail Fly Calypso" by Pat Arthur (As Cozy as an English Pub)
 1977: "De Blue Tail Fly!" by Chris Thompson (Minstrelsy)
 1978: "Jimmy Crack Corn" by Liberty Belle (Yankee Doodle Disco)
 1978: "Blue Tail Fly" by Disco Connection (eponymous)
 1978: "Blue Tail Fly" by Johnny Puleo (Let the Good Times in with Honky Tonk Piano)
 1979: "Blue-Tail Fly (Jimmy Crack Corn)" by Larry Groce (Disney's Children's Favorites)
 1982: "Blue Tail Fly" by Michael Stevens (Country and Western)
 1983: "Blue Tail Fly" by the Royal Philharmonic Orchestra (Hooked on Classics 3 – Journey through the Classics)
 1984: "Blue Tail Fly" by Rich Abao (Der Jäger aus Churpfalz)
 1985 (rec.): "Jimmy Crack Corn" by REM (Hail! Hail! Rock & Roll)
 1985: "Jimmy Crack Corn" by Greg & Steve (Kidding Around)
 1986: "Jimmy Crack Corn" by Jackie Pack (Cookies, Critters, & Bears)
 1987: "Jimmy Crack Corn" by Earl Robinson (Songs of the Working People)
 1987 (rec.): "Jimmy Crack Corn" by Rick Danko (Live at Dylan's Cafe)
 1991: "Olga Crack Corn", an instrumental by the Toy Dolls (Fat Bob's Feet)
 1991: "Jimmy Crack Corn" by Oscar Brand (I Sing, You Sing, We All Sing)
 1994: "The Blue Tail Fly" by Roaring Lion (Sacred 78's)
 2008: "Jimmy Crack Corn (The Blue-Tail Fly)" by Tom Glazer (Tom Glazer Sings Honk-Hiss-Tweet-GGGGGGGGGG and Other Children's Favorites)
 2010: "The Blue Tail Fly" by Frank Macchia (Folk Songs for Jazzers)Musical cameos'''
 1867: "Augustus the Much and Evelina the Mucher" by Tony Pastor (Tony Pastor's Book of Six Hundred Comic Songs and Speeches)
 1962: "Shticks and Stones" by Allan Sherman (My Son, the Folk Singer)
Gimme Jack Cohen and I don't care ... 
 1965: "The Folk Song Army" by Tom Lehrer (That Was the Year That Was)
There are innocuous folk songs,
But we regard 'em with scorn.
The folks who sing 'em have no social conscience.
Why, they don't even care if Jimmy crack corn.
 1976: "Sing Me an Old Fashioned Song" by Billie Jo Spears
 1991: "Jimmy Crack Corn" by Tuff Crew (Still Dangerous)
 1993: "Jimmy Crack Corn" by Raw Breed (Lune Tunz)
 2005: "Duffer St. George" by the Fiery Furnaces (EP)
Duffer St. George and I don't care ... 
 2006: "Jimmy Crack Corn" by Eminem
 2010: "Esme" by Joanna Newsom (Have One on Me)

|headerstyle=background:#ccccff
|style=text-align:center;
}}

 See also 
 "Shoo, Fly, Don't Bother Me!"
 "Polly Wolly Doodle", another minstrel song still sung by American children
 Slave Songs of the United States Songs of the Underground Railroad

 References 

 External links 
 Full lyrics of Dorothy Scarborough's 1925 account in On the Trail of Negro Folk-Songs at Archive.org
 "Jimmy Crack Corn", a modern version recorded in From My People: 400 Years of African American Folklore (Google Books)
 "The Blue Tail Fly [Laws I19]" at the Traditional Ballad Index''
 Lyr Add: (De) Blue Tail Fly discussion on Mudcat.org gives several variants of title and lyrics, early publication information; its links include numerous other discussions of the song. Accessed September 10, 2005.
 Jimmy Crack Corn – Man or Myth discussion on Mudcat.org includes discussion of lyrics, cites further sources. Accessed September 10, 2005.

1840s songs
Blackface minstrel songs
Blue Tail Fly
Blue Tail Fly
American folk songs
American poems
Blue Tail Fly, The
Pete Seeger songs
Songs about fictional male characters
Songs about death